The Detroit Film Critics Society Award for Best Animated Feature is an annual award given by the Detroit Film Critics Society to honor the best animation of that year. The awards was first given in 2017, at the body's eleventh annual ceremony.

Winners 

 † indicates the winner of the Academy Award for Best Animated Feature.

2010s

2020s

Notes
The only times (as of 2022) the winning film for this award didn't match the Academy's choice were 2017 (when The Lego Batman Movie won over Pixar's Coco) and 2021 (when Disney's Encanto won over The Mitchells vs. the Machines).

References

Detroit Film Critics Society Awards
Awards for best animated feature film
Lists of films by award
Awards established in 2017